The 2013 Prestige Hotels & Resorts Curling Classic was held from October 4 to 7 at the Vernon Curling Club in Vernon, British Columbia as part of the 2013–14 World Curling Tour. Both the men's and women's events was held in a triple-knockout format. The purse for the men's event was CAD$26,000, while the purse for the women's event was CAD$39,500.

Men

Teams
The teams are listed as follows:

Knockout results
The draw is listed as follows:

A event

B event

C event

Playoffs

Women

Teams
The teams are listed as follows:

Knockout results
The draw is listed as follows:

A event

B event

C event

Playoffs

References

External links

2013 in Canadian curling
October 2013 sports events in Canada
2013 in British Columbia
Curling in British Columbia
Sport in Vernon, British Columbia